John Campbell, 3rd Earl of Breadalbane and Holland KB (10 March 1696 – 26 January 1782), styled Lord Glenorchy from 1716 until 1752, was a British nobleman, diplomat and politician who sat in the House of Commons from 1727 to 1746.

Background and education
Campbell was the son of John Campbell, 2nd Earl of Breadalbane and Holland and Henrietta Villiers daughter of Sir Edward Villiers, knight marshal. He matriculated at Christ Church, Oxford in 1711.

Political career
Campbell was Envoy to Denmark from 1718, and ambassador to the Russian Empire in 1731.  He was a Lord of the Admiralty in 1741 until the dissolution of Sir Robert Walpole's government the following year.

He was returned as Member of Parliament for Saltash in 1727 and 1734. He was returned as MP for Orford in 1741. He was appointed Master of the Jewel Office in 1745 and resigned his seat in the House of Commons. He succeeded his father as Earl of Breadalbane and Holland on 23 February 1752 and became a Scottish representative peer. He was awarded a DCL from the University of Oxford in 1756, and served as Justice in Eyre south of the Trent from 1756 to 1765 and Vice-Admiral of Scotland from 1776.

Family

Lord Breadalbane and Holland was married on 20 February 1717 to Lady Amabel de Grey, a daughter of Henry Grey, 1st Duke of Kent and his wife, the former Jemima Crew. Lady Amabel died on 2 March 1726 leaving 2 children:

Henry Campbell (c. 1721 - 12 May 1727).
Jemima Campbell, 2nd Marchioness Grey, 4th Baroness Lucas.

The Earl married a second time to Arbella Pershall on 23 January 1730. They also had 2 children:

 George Campbell, Lord Glenorchy (d. 24 March 1744).
 John Campbell, Lord Glenorchy (20 September 1738 – 14 November 1771) (who married Willielma Maxwell).

References

T. F. Henderson, rev. Janet Sorensen, 'Campbell, John, third earl of Breadalbane and Holland (bap. 1696, d. 1782)’, Oxford Dictionary of National Biography, Oxford University Press, 2004 ;online edn, Jan 2008 . Retrieved 18 January 2011.

1696 births
1782 deaths
3
Knights Companion of the Order of the Bath
Glenorchy, John Campbell, Viscount
Ambassadors of Great Britain to Russia
British MPs 1727–1734
British MPs 1734–1741
British MPs 1741–1747
Scottish representative peers
18th-century Scottish landowners
Ambassadors of Great Britain to Denmark
Masters of the Jewel Office